Anticlimax is a genus of sea snails, marine gastropod mollusks in the family Tornidae within the superfamily Truncatelloidea.

Species
Species within the genus Anticlimax include:

 Anticlimax aitormonzoni Rubio & Rolán, 2014 
 Anticlimax annae Pilsbry & Olsson, 1950
 Anticlimax athleenae (Pilsbry & McGinty, 1946)
 Anticlimax bicarinata Rubio & Rolán, 2014
 Anticlimax bicornis Rubio & Rolán, 2014
 Anticlimax boucheti Rubio & Rolán, 2014
 Anticlimax crassilabris (Aguayo & Borro, 1946)
 Anticlimax cyclist Rubio & Rolán, 2014 
 † Anticlimax dalli (Cossmann, 1918) 
 Anticlimax decorata Rolán, Fernández-Garcés & Rubio, 1997
 Anticlimax dentata Rubio & Rolán, 2014 
 Anticlimax elata Rubio & Rolán, 2014 
 Anticlimax fastigata Rubio & Rolán, 2014 
 Anticlimax faviformis Rubio & Rolán, 2014
 Anticlimax fecunda Rubio & Rolán, 2014
 Anticlimax fijiensis Rubio & Rolán, 2014
 Anticlimax glabra Rubio, Rolán & Pelorce, 2011
 Anticlimax globulus Rubio & Rolán, 2014
 † Anticlimax hispaniolensis Pilsbry & Olsson, 1950 
 Anticlimax imitatrix Rubio & Rolán, 2014
 Anticlimax infaceta Rubio & Rolán, 2014
 Anticlimax juanae Rubio & Rolán, 2014
 Anticlimax lentiformis Rubio & Rolán, 2014
 Anticlimax levis Rubio & Rolán, 2014 
 Anticlimax locklini Pilsbry & Olsson, 1950
 Anticlimax maestratii Rubio & Rolán, 2014
 Anticlimax maranii Rubio & Rolán, 2014
 Anticlimax niasensis (Thiele, 1925)
 Anticlimax obesa Rubio & Rolán, 2014
 Anticlimax occidens Pilsbry & Olsson, 1952
 Anticlimax padangensis (Thiele, 1925)
 Anticlimax philippinensis Rubio & Rolán, 2014
 Anticlimax philsmithi Rubio & Rolán, 2014
 Anticlimax pilsbryi (McGinty, 1945)
 Anticlimax proboscidea (Aguayo, 1949)
 Anticlimax puncticulata Rubio & Rolán, 2014
 Anticlimax reinaudi Rubio & Rolán, 2014 
 Anticlimax rhinoceros Rubio & Rolán, 2014 
 Anticlimax robusta Rubio & Rolán, 2014
 Anticlimax rostrata (Hedley, 1900)
 Anticlimax salustianomatoi Rubio & Rolán, 2018
 Anticlimax schumoi (Vanatta, 1913)
 Anticlimax senenbarroi Rubio & Rolán, 2018
 Anticlimax serrata Rubio & Rolán, 2014 
 Anticlimax simplex Rubio & Rolán, 2014 
 Anticlimax simplicissima Rubio & Rolán, 2014
 Anticlimax simulans Rubio & Rolán, 2014
 Anticlimax singularis Rubio & Rolán, 2014
 Anticlimax solomonensis Rubio & Rolán, 2014 
 Anticlimax spiralis Rubio & Rolán, 2014 
 Anticlimax tamarae Rubio & Rolán, 2014 
 Anticlimax tentorii Rubio & Rolán, 2014
 Anticlimax textilis Rubio & Rolán, 2014 
 Anticlimax umbiliglabra Rubio & Rolán, 2014
 Anticlimax uniformis Rubio & Rolán, 2014 
 Anticlimax vanuatuensis Rubio & Rolán, 2014 
 Anticlimax virginiae Rubio & Rolán, 2014
 Anticlimax willetti Hertlein & Strong, 1951

Species brought into synonymy
 Anticlimax (Subclimax) Pilsbry & Olsson, 1950: synonym of Anticlimax Pilsbry & McGinty, 1946 (alternate representation)
 † Anticlimax (Subclimax) hispaniolensis Pilsbry & Olsson, 1950: synonym of  † Anticlimax hispaniolensis Pilsbry & Olsson, 1950

References

 Pilsbry H.A. & McGinty T.L. (1946). Vitrinellidae of Florida, part 4. Nautilus, 60(1): 12-18, pl. 2

External links
  To World Register of Marine Species

Tornidae
Gastropod genera